The 1995 Hall of Fame Tennis Championships (also known as 1995 Miller Lite Hall of Fame Championships for sponsorship reasons) was a men's tennis tournament played on grass courts at the International Tennis Hall of Fame in Newport, Rhode Island in the United States and was part of the World Series of the 1995 ATP Tour. It was the 20th edition of the tournament and was held from July 10 through July 16, 1995. Sixth-seeded David Prinosil won the singles title.

Finals

Singles
 David Prinosil defeated  David Wheaton 7–6(7–3), 5–7, 6–2
 It was Prinosil's first singles title of his career.

Doubles
 Jörn Renzenbrink /  Markus Zoecke defeated  Paul Kilderry /  Nuno Marques 6–1, 6–2

References

External links
 Official website
 ATP tournament profile
 ITF tournament edition details

Miller Lite Hall of Fame Championships
Hall of Fame Open
Hall of Fame Tennis Championships
Hall of Fame Tennis Championships
Hall of Fame Tennis Championships